Márius Charizopulos (born 9 November 1990) is a Slovak football midfielder who plays for Austrian club SC-ESV Parndorf 1919.

Family and Career
Charizopulos has a Greek origin because his grandfather was from Greece and he married his Slovak wife and they had three sons. Márius was born in Slovakia, to a father with Greek origin and a Slovak mother. Márius's brother Nikolaos is also footballer who currently plays for Čermáňsky FK Nitra. Márius' cousin Leonidas is a footballer, too.

FC ViOn Zlaté Moravce
He made his professional debut for FC ViOn Zlaté Moravce against Spartak Myjava on 1 April 2014.

References

External links
 
 Futbalnet profile
 Corgoň Liga profile
 Eurofotbal profile

1990 births
Sportspeople from Nitra
Slovak people of Greek descent
Living people
Slovak footballers
Association football midfielders
FK Slovan Duslo Šaľa players
FC ViOn Zlaté Moravce players
FC Nitra players
Győri ETO FC players
Spartak Myjava players
SC-ESV Parndorf 1919 players
Slovak Super Liga players
2. Liga (Slovakia) players
Nemzeti Bajnokság II players
Austrian Landesliga players
Slovak expatriate footballers
Slovak expatriate sportspeople in Hungary
Expatriate footballers in Hungary
Slovak expatriate sportspeople in Austria
Expatriate footballers in Austria